Early general elections were held in Kuwait on 17 May 2008 after the Emir Sabah Al-Sabah dissolved the National Assembly of Kuwait on 19 March 2008 over constant clashes between the government and the elected MPs. The last elections were held less than two years previously and saw a loose alliance of reformists and Islamists gain almost two thirds of the seats.

Nearly 362,000 Kuwaitis were eligible to vote, more than half of them women, and 27 of the 275 candidates were women; none of the female candidates won.

New rules introduced for this election have changed the 25 constituencies electing two to five electing 10. This was a demand of the reformist Kuwaiti Orange Movement, which led mass demonstrations in 2006, who believed the change would impede vote buying electoral frauds.

A leading theme in the election was inflation, which hit a record high 9.5% four months before the election.  Many candidates in the election proposed increased governmental subsidies to be funded by oil profits.

Results

Aftermath
Following the election, Jassem Al-Kharafi was elected speaker.

References

Kuwait
Elections in Kuwait
2008 in Kuwait